The men's freestyle 86 kg is a competition featured at the 2014 European Wrestling Championships, and was held in Vantaa, Finland on April 4.

Medalists

Results
Legend
F — Won by fall

Final

Top half

Bottom half

Repechage

References

External links
Official website

Men's freestyle 86 kg